Group A of the 1996 Fed Cup Europe/Africa Zone Group II was one of four pools in the Europe/Africa zone of the 1996 Fed Cup. Four teams competed in a round robin competition, with the top two teams advancing to the play-offs.

Poland vs. Lithuania

Botswana vs. Ethiopia

Poland vs. Botswana

Lithuania vs. Ethiopia

Poland vs. Ethiopia

Lithuania vs. Botswana

See also
Fed Cup structure

References

External links
 Fed Cup website

1996 Fed Cup Europe/Africa Zone